El Bour is a village in the commune of N'Goussa, in N'Goussa District, Ouargla Province, Algeria.

References

Neighbouring towns and cities

Populated places in Ouargla Province